The  are a set of hills located in the mid-western part of Aichi Prefecture, Japan. Centuries ago, this area made up the eastern portion of the Owari Domain.

From there, the hills stretch from the city of Inuyama on the southern banks of the Kiso River to the southeast, going through the communities of Komaki and Kasugai, then continuing to the southwest until Mount Sanage along the border between Toyota and Seto. From there, the hills continue in a south westerly direction before finishing on the Chita Peninsula.

References

Landforms of Aichi Prefecture
Hills of Japan